Asota caricae, the tropical tiger moth, is a species of noctuoid moth in the family Erebidae. It is found from the Indo-Australian tropics of India and Sri Lanka to Queensland and Vanuatu.

Description
The wingspan is 51–58 mm. Palpi with black spots on 1st and 2nd joints. Forewings brownish fuscous. There is a basal orange patch with two subbasal black spots and a series of three spots on its outer edge, that matches the coloration of the scales of the thorax. The veins are streaked with white. There is a white spot at lower angle of the discal cell. Hindwings are orange yellow, with a black spot at the end of the discal cell, one beyond, one below vein 2 and a submarginal irregular series which sometimes becomes a nearly complete marginal band. The veins crossing the band are yellowish. Larva black above, with two dorsal white bands, a sub-dorsal black spot on each somite. A series of lateral black specks present with sparse black hairs. Ventral coloration brown, head capsule is reddish.

Ecology
The larvae have been recorded on Ficus, Broussonetia, Mesua, Tectona and Shorea species. Pupation is in a slight cocoon, fixed to a leaf. The species is found in forest and agricultural areas.

Subspecies
There are three described subspecies:

Asota caricae caricae Fabricius, 1775 (South East Asia, India, Bangladesh, Indonesia, China to Papua New Guinea)
Asota caricae euroa Rothschild, 1897  (Solomon Islands)
Asota caricae melanesiensis Viette, 1951 (Melanesia)

References

External links
 Form purimargo info
 caricae caricae info
 Population Explosions of Tiger Moth Lead to Lepidopterism Mimicking Infectious Fever Outbreaks.
 The Snouted Tigers (Lepidoptera: Erebidae, Aganainae) of Papua Indonesia
 Tiger Moth, Project Noah

Asota (moth)
Moths of Asia
Moths of Oceania
Moths described in 1775
Taxa named by Johan Christian Fabricius
Erebidae